Leon Independent School District is a public school district based in Jewett, Texas, (USA).

In addition to Jewett, the district serves the city of  Marquez. A small portion of the district extends into northeastern Robertson County.

The district has three campuses – Leon High (Grades 9-12), Leon Junior High (Grades 7-8), and Leon Elementary (Grades PK-6).  Notwithstanding that Leon is Spanish for lion, the school mascot is not the lion, but the cougar.
In 2009, the school district was rated "academically acceptable" by the Texas Education Agency.

References

External links
Leon ISD
Gustafson Agency

School districts in Leon County, Texas
School districts in Robertson County, Texas